Emerick Setiano (born 19 July 1996) is a French rugby union player. His position is prop and he currently plays for Toulon in the Top 14.

References

External links
France profile at FFR
Toulon profile
L'Équipe profile

1996 births
Living people
Sportspeople from Angers
Rugby union players from Wallis and Futuna
French rugby union players
RC Toulonnais players
Rugby union props
France international rugby union players